Robotech is a shortened version of robotechnology, in context of a science fiction media franchise that includes:
 Robotech (TV series), the 1985 animated television series that debuted in North America
 Robotech: The Movie, the 1986 Cannon film that was shelved after poor test screenings
 Robotech art books, published by Starblaze Graphics and Stonebridge Press
 Robotech Collectible Card Game, published by Hero Factory
 Robotech comics, from various publishers ranging from Comico to DC Comics
 Robotech music, created by Ulpio Minucci and other composers
 Robotech (novels), written by Jack McKinney
 Robotech (role-playing game), first published by Palladium Books in 1986
 Robotech live-action film, see Robotech#Proposed live-action film